This is a list of airlines currently operating in American Samoa.

See also
 List of airlines
 List of defunct airlines of Oceania

American Samoa
Transportation in American Samoa
American Samoa
American Samoa
Airlines

Lists of organizations based in American Samoa